Finnish News Agency (STT; , FNB) is a Finnish news agency, established in 1887 and based in Helsinki. STT's majority owner is Sanoma Media Finland of the Sanoma Group. The Finnish public service broadcaster Yle is among the minority shareholders.

STT is a sister agency of the Swedish wire service  TT, Norwegian NTB, and Danish Ritzau.

References

External links
 Suomen Tietotoimisto STT

News agencies based in Finland
Mass media in Helsinki
1882 establishments in Finland
Mass media companies established in 1882
21st-century Finnish politicians